Concinnia is a genus of skinks in the subfamily Lygosominae.

Taxonomy and systematics
The genus Concinnia belongs to the Australian Sphenomorphid clade that contains other genera such as Ctenotus, Anomalopus and the Eulamprus water skinks. This genus was raised by Skinner et al.(2013) based on molecular phylogenetic analysis of mitochondrial and nuclear DNA sequences, which showed that five sampled species from the Eulamprus tenuis group formed a well supported clade with the then monotypic genera Gnypetoscincus and Nangura. Wells and Wellington (1983) coined the name Concinnia and applied it to the Eulamprus tenuis group delimited by Greer (1989). Although this tenuis group may form a clade it did not receive strong support in molecular phylogenetic analyses, with C. amplus and C. frerei forming deep lineages of uncertain position relative to C. queenslandiae and C. spinosus. Consequently, Skinner et al. (2013) united the well supported broader clade, including Gnypetoscincus and Nangura in Concinnia, including C. frerei and C. sokosoma based on the work of O'Connor and Moritz (2003). Skinner and co-authors (2013) further restricted the genus Eulamprus to the water skinks assigned by Greer (1989) to the Eulamprus quoyii group and created two new genera; Silvascincus for species in Greer's (1989) Eulamprus murrayi group (including E. murrayi and E. tryoni), and Tumbunascincus for Eulamprus luteilateralis.

Species
There are currently 7 recognized species:
 Concinnia ampla Covacevich & McDonald, 1980 – lemon-barred forest-skink
 Concinnia brachyosoma (Lönnberg and Andersson, 1915) – northern barsided skink
 Concinnia frerei Greer, 1992 – stout barsided skink
 Concinnia martini Wells & Wellington, 1983 – dark barsided skink
 Concinnia sokosoma Greer, 1992 – stout barsided skink
 Concinnia tenuis (Gray, 1831) bar-sided forest-skink, barred-sided skink
 Concinnia tigrina (De Vis, 1888) – yellow-blotched forest-skink, rainforest water-skink

Hinulia elegans, described by Gray in 1838, is an unidentified lygosomine that may be Concinnia tenuis.

References

Further reading

  (2006). Using ancient and recent DNA to explore relationships of extinct and endangered Leiolopisma skinks (Reptilia: Scincidae) in the Mascarene islands. Molecular Phylogenetics and Evolution 39 (2): 503–511.  (HTML abstract).
  (1843). Systema Reptilium, Fasciculus Primus, Amblyglossae. Vienna: Braumüller & Seidel. 106 pp. + indices. (Eulamprus, new genus, p. 22). (in Latin).
  (2008). A replacement name for Sphenomorphus keiensis (Kopstein, 1926) from the southeastern Moluccas, Indonesia (Reptilia: Squamata: Scincidae) with a redescription of the species. Zoologische Mededelingen Leiden 82 (52): 737–747. PDF.

 
Lizard genera
Taxa named by Richard Walter Wells
Taxa named by Cliff Ross Wellington